Skeletonweed is a common name for many species of plants, including:

Chaetadelpha wheeleri, an asterid
Chondrilla juncea, an invasive asterid
Eriogonum deflexum, a buckwheat
Pleiacanthus spinosus, an asterid
Shinnersoseris spp. of the asterids